Reginald Stanley Pearce (born 12 January 1930) was an English professional footballer who played as a wing half for Sunderland.

References

1930 births
Footballers from Liverpool
English footballers
Association football wing halves
Winsford United F.C. players
Luton Town F.C. players
Sunderland A.F.C. players
Cambridge City F.C. players
Peterborough United F.C. players
English Football League players
Living people